Pervomayskoye is a rural locality (a selo) in Burlinsky Selsoviet, Burlinsky District, Altai Krai, Russia. The population was 180 as of 2013. There are 4 streets.

Geography 
Pervomayskoye is located 7 km northwest of Burla (the district's administrative centre) by road. Burla is the nearest rural locality.

References 

Rural localities in Burlinsky District